Lin I-chin (born 25 August 1969) is a Taiwanese politician.

Early life and education
Lin was born in Tainan on 25 August 1969. She later earned a master's degree in political economy at National Cheng Kung University.

Political career
Lin participated in the Wild Lily student movement and successively worked with political figures associated with the Democratic Progressive Party, such as Lin Yi-hsiung, William Lai, Chen Shui-bian, and Tsai Ing-wen. Between 1998 and 2010, Lin served on the Tainan County Council. From 2010 to 2020, she was a member of the succeeding body, the Tainan City Council. In January 2020, Lin was elected to the 10th Legislative Yuan, representing Tainan's fourth constituency. In November 2020, Lin commented on fake news disseminated by CTi News. In July 2022, she discussed the nuances of euthanasia in Taiwan. In August 2022, Lin visited legislative counterparts in Germany.

References

Women local politicians in Taiwan
20th-century Taiwanese women politicians
National Cheng Kung University alumni
Living people
1969 births
Tainan Members of the Legislative Yuan
Democratic Progressive Party Members of the Legislative Yuan
Members of the 10th Legislative Yuan
Tainan City Councilors
21st-century Taiwanese women politicians
Soochow University (Taiwan) alumni